Not Always Sexy is the first full-length studio album by Amanda Richards. It was recorded in 2004 at Laundry Room Studios in Troutdale, Oregon.

Track listing

All songs written, performed and produced by Amanda Richards.

 "All the Way to the Bottom"
 "Magnum 45"
 "Share the Load"
 "Not Always Sexy"
 "Cool Waters"
 "That Much To Me"
 "Cookies and Whiskey"
 "Love's Gonna Shine"
 "Try it Again"
 "Close to Me"
 "Oasis"
 "What I Need"

Personnel
 Amanda Richards – guitar, piano, vocal
 Brad Haskins – keyboard
 Eric Savage – electric guitar, bass guitar

Production
 Amanda Richards – producer
 Eric Savage – engineer and co-producer

External links
 

2004 debut albums